Albert Edward Lester Kirchner (7 January 1888 – 23 January 1942) was a former Australian rules footballer who played with South Melbourne in the Victorian Football League (VFL) and Sturt in the South Australian Football League (SAFL).

References

External links 
Alby (Ted) Kirchner's profile at AustralianFootball.com

1888 births
1942 deaths
Sydney Swans players
Sturt Football Club players
Australian rules footballers from Melbourne
Australian military personnel of World War I
People from North Melbourne
Military personnel from Melbourne